John "Tito" Gerassi was a professor and journalist born in Paris on July 12, 1931, and died in New York City July 26, 2012.  Gerassi wrote  a number  of books on Latin America, Jean-Paul Sartre, and political affairs.  He  taught at a variety of colleges and universities in the United States and in France. Most notably, Gerassi was a longtime professor in the Political Science department at Queens College of the City University of New York. He taught at Queens College from 1981 until his passing. He was an activist in the New Left and a leading thinker regarding the significance of Sartre's work.

His father was Fernando Gerassi, a Sephardic Jew and an anarchist general who defended the Republic from Franco during the Spanish Civil War. His mother was Stephania Avdykovych, Ukrainian and daughter of Klymentyna Avdykovych, famous Lviv candy factory owner.

Bibliography
John Gerassi. The Great Fear: The Reconquest of Latin America by Latin Americans. New York: Macmillan, 1963. According to WorldCat, the book is in 883 libraries
John Gerassi. The Boys of Boise; Furor, Vice, and Folly in an American City. New York: Macmillan, 1966.
John Gerassi. North Vietnam: a Documentary. Indianapolis: Bobbs-Merrill, 1968.
John Gerassi, Venceremos! The Speeches and Writings of Ernesto Che Guevarra, New York: The Macmillan Company, 1968.
John Gerassi. The Coming of the New International: A Revolutionary Anthology. New York: The World Publishing Company, 1971
John Gerassi. Towards Revolution. London: Weidenfeld and Nicolson, 1971
John Gerassi. The Premature Antifascists: North American Volunteers in the Spanish Civil War, 1936-39 : an Oral History. New York: Praeger, 1986.
John Gerassi, Jean-Paul Sartre: Hated Conscience of His Century, Chicago: The University of Chicago Press, 1989. According to WorldCat, the book is in 807 libraries
John Gerassi. The Anachronists. Cambridge: Black Apollo Press, 2006.
John Gerassi. Talking with Sartre: Conversations and Debates. New Haven, CT: Yale University Press, 2009
John Gerassi and Tony Monchinski, Unrepentant Radical Educator: The Writings of John Gerassi, Rotterdam: Sense Publishers, 2009.

References 

1931 births
2012 deaths
American Sephardic Jews
French emigrants to the United States
French journalists
French people of Turkish-Jewish descent
French Sephardi Jews
American male journalists
American people of French-Jewish descent
American people of Turkish-Jewish descent
Jewish American writers
20th-century American non-fiction writers
21st-century American non-fiction writers
21st-century American male writers
20th-century American male writers
21st-century American Jews